Hypena eductalis, the red-footed bomolocha moth or alder smoke, is a moth of the family Noctuidae. The species was first described by Francis Walker in 1859. It is found in North America from Saskatchewan to Nova Scotia south to Florida and Texas.

It was formerly placed in a separate genus, Lomanaltes which is now a synonym of Hypena.

The wingspan is about 25 mm. There are two generations per year in much of the eastern part of its range.

The larvae feed on the underside of the leaves of alder.

References

eductalis
Moths of North America